Leonie Pieper (born 24 August 1992) is a German rower.

She won a medal at the 2019 World Rowing Championships.

References

External links

1992 births
Living people
German female rowers
Sportspeople from Düsseldorf
World Rowing Championships medalists for Germany